, also spelled as Princess Sarah, is a Japanese anime series produced by Nippon Animation, based on Frances Hodgson Burnett's 1905 novel, A Little Princess. Spanning 46 episodes, it originally premiered in 1985 across Japan on Fuji Television as the 11th series of Nippon Animation's World Masterpiece Theater.

Outline
This work is one of the most well-known works in "the World Masterpiece Theater", the story describes an orphan girl who endures persistent bullying in the dormitory. Negative factors such as orphan, poverty and child abuse are fully adopted. It is one of the most well-known Japanese manga/anime on the theme of "bullying" of the juvenile world, the highest audience rating marked five eighteenths. The series has also been selected as one of the best 100 Japanese anime series of all time by viewers of TV Asahi.

It was also later aired across Japan by the anime television network, Animax, who also later broadcast the series across its respective networks worldwide, including its English language networks in South Asia and Southeast Asia, dubbing and translating the series into English under the title Princess Sarah. Animax's adaptation was the series' only English translation and the series has yet to be commercially released in the United States, Canada and the United Kingdom.

In the Philippines, Princess Sarah was aired on ABS-CBN in the early 1990s with various rebroadcasts since then. Its popularity inspired a live-action film Sarah... Ang Munting Prinsesa and a primetime TV drama series.

The show was also dubbed in Arabic under the title سالي (romanized as Sally). After its success with Arabic-speaking audiences, the show was also rerun to Arabic-speaking audiences around the turn of the twenty-first century. سالي was subsequently added to Netflix Middle East on November 19, 2020.

Story
In the year 1885, the story follows Sara Crewe, the young daughter of, Captain Ralph Crewe, who is extremely wealthy due to running a diamond mine in British-ruled India. She starts attending an all-girl's seminary boarding school in London, where she excels in her studies and is loved deeply by many of her friends and classmates. 

Tragedy strikes when Sara's father passes away of Jungle Fever and her family goes bankrupt, leaving her to become a poor orphan. The school's headmistress, Miss Minchin, takes advantage of this situation and makes her an unpaid maid in the school, trying hard to make her life as miserable as possible. However, Sara, with the help of her friends, perseveres and tries to endure all her hardships until redemption comes at last.

When Miss Minchin continues to mistreat her further, Sara befriends Mr. Carmichael, a solicitor who wanted to save her from Miss Minchin's mistreatment until she meets her father's lifelong friend Tom Carrisford who lives next door to the seminary. Tom decides to adopt Sara to redeem himself over his guilt for the loss of her father and to restore her status as a diamond princess. Miss Minchin angrily confronts Tom to get Sara back to the seminary but to her dismay Sara has already been adopted, causing her to return to the seminary in disgrace as her younger sister Amelia angrily berates her for the mistreatment she had put on Sara by making her a maid and forcing her to stay at the horse stable, making Miss Minchin emotionally regretful for her actions. Sara however, agrees to return to the school and also convinces Mr. Carrisford to make a large donation to it.

Sara waved goodbye to her friends in the dormitory as she and Becky return to the British Raj for 4 months to finish the necessary formalities regarding her father's inheritance and to visit her parents graves by travelling in the cruise ship. But she does not forget when she was poor, she gives money to people on the street, maybe Sara and Becky will return to London again after 4 months.

Characters

Main characters

The story's protagonist, the daughter of Captain Ralph Crewe, who runs a diamond mine in the British Raj, therefore she was nicknamed as "Diamond Princess". She was brought to Miss Minchin's seminary in London to learn how to be a proper lady, after being raised in India.
At the age of four, she lost her mother. Due to being pampered and doted on her entire life, Sara's knowledge of the world is limited, but she is still a very intelligent and imaginative girl. 
After her father died and she was left destitute, Miss Minchin forced Sara to work as an unpaid servant in the seminary, but Sara instead feels like that she is a princess inside. She refuses to lose hope and remains kind-hearted and compassionate. After persistent bullyings, she was falsely accused of arson and expelled from Miss Minchin's seminary, where she was taken over by Peter's house. Eventually Sara was taken over by Tom Carrisford, and her father Ralph's bankruptcy was cancelled and she became rich again.

The main antagonist is severe headmistress of the seminary where Sara is sent to.
Minchin established the seminary from the plebeian birth, and she hated Sara due to the wealthy birth. Minchin was swayed by the selfishness of Sara's father Ralph and was forced to prepare a servant, a horse and a special room for Sara.
Minchin hid hatred to Sara due to Ralph's vast fortune and the appearance of her seminary and herself. When Sara was reduced to poverty and an orphan, Miss Minchin stopped masking hatred and persistently maltreated Sara.

voiced by: Mie Suzuki
A country girl who comes to work at Miss Minchin's seminary in order to support her family.
Despite her situation, Becky is optimistic and something of a dreamer. She is maltreated by Miss Minchin and her fellow staff, but befriended by Sara.

The secondary antagonist. She is a daughter of a petroleum new rich of the United States, and a prideful and very manipulative girl. 
Lavinia was originally the most popular student at Miss Minchin's seminary, and thus becomes madly jealous when Sara begins to get more attention than her. Even when Sara was reduced to a servant, Lavinia continued to make her life miserable. The reason why she hated Sara is "calm even if she has fallen".
When Sara became rich again, Lavinia told Sara that "When you become the Diamond Queen, I will be the wife of the President of the United States".
In "bullyers" in Japanese manga and anime, she is the second most well known character after Gian in "Doraemon".

A street-smart boy who becomes Sara's carriage driver when his father cannot accept the job.
He was fired when Ralph died and Sara fell to a penniless, after this he was employed in another workplace. Peter thinks very highly of Sara, and continued to call her "ojōsama" (princess) even after her fall to hired help and harbours a crush on her. In the original novel, he doesn't exist.

Servants & Students of Miss Minchin's seminary

A plump girl who becomes one of Sara's friends after Sara defends her from Lavinia's abusive treatment towards her. 
Ermengarde frequently does poorly in her studies, while her father, a university professor, pushes her to excel. She has an aunt, who is somewhat absentminded, but is quite skilled in herbalism, which proves pivotal in curing Sara when she becomes seriously ill.

The youngest student at the seminary who is four years old. At first, Lottie acts contrary, but the little girl calms down significantly after Sara becomes her surrogate mother. She is a crybaby, and screaming as "Sara Mom" every time a certain thing.

One of Lavinia's friends. She and Gertrude are initially somewhat in awe of Sara, much to Lavinia's consternation. Once Sara is demoted to live-in help, they willingly join in Lavinia's tormenting of Sara.

One of Lavinia's friends. She, Lavinia and Jessie are also willingly join in tormenting Sara.

A harsh head maid.

A chef that is picky on what he cooks. Like Molly, he is also harsh on other servants, especially Becky.

Miss Minchin's younger sister. The personality is gentle but submissive. Amelia was raised by her elder sister Maria Minchin and her aunt, so she cannot resist Maria Minchin.

The Miss Minchin seminary's French teacher. He is impressed by Sara's aptitude at speaking French from the start and is the only member of the faculty who continues to treat Sara with unqualified kindness and civility after her demotion. He was expelled from the Miss Minchin seminary's due to Lavinia's dissatisfaction that "He patronizes Sara who has fallen to a servant".

A corporate lawyer at Miss Minchin's seminary. He invested in Ralph's diamond mine, and is more obsessed with Ralph's diamond mine than Miss Minchin's seminary. When the diamond mine went bankrupt and Ralph died of fever, he confiscated Sara's property and personal belongings.

Relatives and other people

Sara's devoted father. Tom Carrisford's best friend.
At the beginning, he sent Sara to Miss Minchin's seminary to return to India. Later, when he discovered the diamond mine with his friend Carrisford, he planned to operate the mining business, When he was operating, he misunderstood the news that the business failed and died of scarlet fever. Faced with the situation of declaring bankruptcy and debt problems, Sara encountered a lot of ups and downs, and made her friend Chris Ford feel deeply guilty for this.However, when Carrisford was responsible for filling the gaps on his behalf and the court withdrew the original bankruptcy declaration. In addition, the development of the diamond mine has been carried out smoothly, resulting in high turnover. The situation turned around, and finally Sara was able to return to her rich life.

Sara's unnamed mother,Ralph's late wife.a frenchman with brown hair and green eyes died of illness when Sarah was 4 years old. she only appears in Sarah's memories and on the photo frames of Sarah's family in Kashmir. 

Peter's unnamed father.

Peter's unnamed mother.

Lavinia's father, a petroleum new rich of the United States. He is basically generous to his daughter Lavinia, but strict about terrible behavior. When Lavinia tried to make Sara a servant, he slapped Lavinia and blocked it.

Lavinia's mother. She has the same prideful personality as her daughter Lavinia.

A lifelong friend of Ralph Crewe who convinced him to invest in the Indian diamond mine. Believing himself guilty for both Ralph's death and for causing the bankruptcy of both him and Sara, Carrisford makes it his mission to find Sara and reinstate her wealth. At the end, he took over Sara.

An Indian man who serves Tom Carrisford.

Mr. Carrisford's solicitor and confidant. He journeys across Europe to find Sara Crewe in the bedridden Carrisford's stead.

Mr. Carmichael's polite and generous son who befriends Sara, unaware of her connection to his father's client.

Mr. Carmichael's daughter, an elder sister of Donald Carmichael.

Becky's younger brother.

Becky's younger sister.

Peter's friend as a chimney sweep boy. Together with Peter with a chimney sweep, he hides at Miss Minchin's school to help Sara Crewe, who is sick.

A street child and an orphan who always stands by a bakery. When Sara saw her hungry situation, Sara gave bread to her. Finally, she was taken to the bakery.

A soldier who helps Sara pick up the potatoes during a rainy day, but he doesn't speak.

A kind-hearted priest in a church in the city. When Sara picked up a four-pence silver coin and delivered it to the church, she preached that it was "God's gift" and brought it home.

The owner of a bakery in the city. When she saw Sara giving bread to Anne, she described Anne as an "angelic child". Later, she took Anne to her bakery.

An acquaintance of Peter, he runs a stall flower shop in the market. She remembers Sarah when she was a young lady and cares about her.

The original owner of the doll "Emily" at a clothes store in the city. Emily, which is the signboard of the store that is not for sale, is handed over to Sarah, and at the same time she receives an order for Sarah's clothes (measurement at this time will be a hint later). He has also saved a fallen Sarah.

Animal characters

A domestic cat of Miss Minchin's seminary, but he doesn't exist in the novel.

A parrot that Sara brought from India at the time of admission. The cliché is "Sara".
At the beginning, Sarah's father Crewe brought Sarah from India to Miss Minchin's seminary in London as a companion for Sarah.When Sarah face to her father Ralph's death, it was taken away by Mr. Barrow as a mortgage of Crewe's "debt", until Sarah returned to her original life, and returned to Sarah's side with the help of Peter and Mr. Carmichael.

A horse which has a white diamond-shaped spots on the forehead that Ralph kept in Minchin.
At the beginning, when Sarah was a rich daughter, Captain Ralph bought it as an exclusive carriage for Sarah.When Sarah face to her father Ralph's death, it was taken away by Mr. Barrow as a mortgage of Crewe's "debt", until Sarah returned to her original life, and returned to Sarah's side with the help of Peter and Mr. Carmichael.

Ram Dass' mischievous monkey.

Tom Carrisford's breed resembles a large long-haired Afghan hound, which in the original work is actually the dog raised by the Carmichael family.

Staff
 Original work: Frances Hodgson Burnett's A Little Princess
 Planning: Shōji Satō, Eiichi Kubota (Fuji TV)
 Director: Fumio Kurokawa
 Screenplay: Hidemi Kamata, Keiko Mukuroji, Ryūzō Nakanishi
 Storyboard: Eiji Okabe, Fumio Kurokawa, Jun Hirabayashi, Kenjirō Yoshida, Kōzō Kusuba, Masakazu Higuchi, Norio Yazawa, Shigeo Koshi, Takayoshi Suzuki, Yoshio Kuroda, Yukio Suzuki, Yūsaku Sakamoto
 Character design: Shunji Saida
 Animation directors: Atsuko Ōtani, Kuniyuki Ishii, Shunji Saida, Toshiki Yamazaki
 Assistant directors: Jirō Saitō, Shinya Hanai, Takeshi Yamaguchi
 Art director: Nobuo Numai
 Art setting: Shōhei Kawamoto
 Color design: Kaoru Uno
 Director of photography: Toshiaki Morita
 Editing: Shinichi Natori, Takeshi Seyama, Yoshihiro Kasahara
 Layout editing: Yasuji Mori
 Music: Yasuo Higuchi
 Sound director: Nobuhiro Komatsu
 Sound effects: Akihiko Matsuda
 Sound mixing: Hideyuki Tanaka
 Special effects: Masao Yoshiyama
 Producer: Junzō Nakajima, Taihei Ishikawa (Fuji TV)
 Executive producer: Kōichi Motohashi
 Production desk: Shun'ichi Kosao
 Production manager: Mitsuru Takakuwa
 Production: Nippon Animation, Fuji TV

Theme songs
 Opening theme: 
 Ending theme: 
(Both songs)
 Song by: Satoko Shimonari
 Lyrics: Rei Nakanishi
 Composition: Kōichi Morita
 Arrangement: Katsuhisa Hattori

Episodes

International titles
 小公女セーラ (Japanese Title)
 Die kleine Prinzessin Sara (German Title)
 La Princesa Sara (Spanish Title)
 Little Princess (English Title)
 Sara Lovely Sara (Italian Title)
 Mała księżniczka Sara (Polish Title)
 Princess Sara (English Title)
 Princesse Sarah (French Title)
 Sali سالي (Arabic Title)
 Sarah, Ang Munting Prinsesa (Tagalog Title)
 Küçük Prenses (Turkish Title)
 莎拉公主 (Chinese Title)
 소공녀 세라 Sogongnyeo Serra (Korean Title)

Adaptations
The anime was remade into a live-action film by Star Cinema in the Philippines under the title Sarah... Ang Munting Prinsesa ("Sarah... The Little Princess") in 1995 starring Camille Prats as Sarah Crewe. The film was also dubbed in several languages and subbed in English. In 1996, Camille Prats was nominated for Best Child Actress at the FAMAS Awards. The movie was digitally restored and remastered by ABS CBN Film Restoration Project (which to date are restoring old damaged classic Filipino films) to a more high depth 1080p HD format, and was also released back into the cinemas along with a Red Carpet premiere.

The anime was remade in 2007 into a television series, also titled Princess Sarah, by ABS-CBN in the Philippines. Starring Sharlene San Pedro as Sarah Crewe, the drama was aired on ABS-CBN's Primetime Bida evening block and worldwide on The Filipino Channel from November 12 to December 21, 2007. The series was shot in Camp John Hay in Baguio City and the Coconut Palace in Manila. Unlike the 1995 Filipino film and the Japanese anime series it was based from, which in turn was based on Burnett's original novel, the "teleserye" adaptation took further creative liberties from the original story, with Lavinia as Miss Minchin's daughter, Ram Dass being depicted as a female sorceress, and fantasy elements being introduced in the story.

Notes and references

Further reading 

  See page 30.
  See pp. 475–476, 932.
  See page 201.

External links
 
 Animax's official website for Princess Sarah 
 Animax Asia's official website for Princess Sarah
 Animax South Asia's official website for Princess Sarah

See also

 Oshin
Same as this work, a TV drama about a girl who endures poverty and bullying. Broadcast in 1983.
 Daiei TV-Film
During mid-1980s, this TV production produced TV dramas which depicts girls who gains success after many hardships like "Princess Sarah".

1985 anime television series debuts
1985 Japanese television series endings
World Masterpiece Theater series
Fiction set in 1885
Television series set in the 1880s
Drama anime and manga
Sara
Fictional orphans
Orphan characters in anime and manga
Historical anime and manga
School life in anime and manga
Adventure anime and manga
Animated television series about orphans
Works about school bullying
Television series about bullying
Television shows about death
Television series about princesses
Television shows set in London
Television shows set in England
Television shows set in the British Raj
Television shows set in India
Middle East Broadcasting Center
1980s children's television series
Television shows based on American novels
Television shows based on British novels